The women's 10 km and 12.5 km long distance competitions in biathlon of the 2011 IPC Biathlon and Cross-Country Skiing World Championships were held on April 10, 2011.
http://athletes-news-live.blogspot.com/2011/11/women-10km-cross-country-skiing-2011.html

Medals

Results

Sitting 
The women's 10 km, sitting. Skiers compete on a sitski.

Final

Standing 
The women's 12.5 km, standing.

Final

Visually impaired 
In the women's 12.5 km, visually impaired, skiers with a visual impairment compete with a sighted guide. Dual medals are rewarded.

Final

References

2011 IPC Biathlon and Cross-Country Skiing World Championships Live results, and schedule at ipclive.siwidata.com
WCH - Khanty Mansiysk - Results - Biathlon Long, IPC Nordic Skiing

Long distance